The military rank of lieutenant, in the United States Navy, United States Coast Guard, National Oceanic and Atmospheric Administration Commissioned Officer Corps (NOAA-COO), and United States Public Health Service Commissioned Corps (PHS-CC), is divided between:

 Lieutenant (O-3), equivalent to a Captain in the U.S. Army, Air Force & Marines
 Lieutenant junior grade (O-2), sometimes referred as "lieutenant j.g." 

In the United States Army, Air Force, and Marine Corps it is divided between:

 First lieutenant (O-2), sometimes called simply "lieutenant"
 Second lieutenant (O-1), equivalent to an Ensign in the Navy, Coast Guard, NOAA-COO & PHS-CC

During the American Civil War (1861-1865), brevet second lieutenants in the Union Army and Confederate States Army were sometimes also known as "third lieutenants".

Police and fire departments in the United States may also use the rank of lieutenant.

Military ranks of the United States Army
Military ranks of the United States Navy
Officer ranks of the United States Air Force
Military ranks of the United States Marine Corps